Turmayevo (Tormay) is a rural locality (a selo) in Yangurchinsky Selsoviet, Sterlibashevsky District, Bashkortostan, Russia. The population was 378 as of 2010. There are 4 streets.

Geography 
Turmayevo is located 16 km northwest of Sterlibashevo (the district's administrative centre) by road. Bankovka is the nearest rural locality.

References 

Rural localities in Sterlibashevsky District